Tajuria isaeus is a butterfly in the family Lycaenidae. It is found in South-East Asia.

Subspecies
Tajuria isaeus isaeus (Borneo, Sumatra)
Tajuria isaeus tyro de Nicéville, 1895 (Burma, northern Thailand)
Tajuria isaeus verna Corbet, 1940 (southern Thailand, Peninsular Malaya)

References

Butterflies described in 1865
Tajuria
Butterflies of Borneo
Butterflies of Asia
Taxa named by William Chapman Hewitson